Auma is a river of Thuringia, Germany. It is a tributary of the Weida, which it joins in the town Weida.

See also
List of rivers of Thuringia

Rivers of Thuringia
Rivers of Germany